Abasxanlı (also, Abaskhanly) is a village and municipality in the Agsu Rayon of Azerbaijan.  It has a population of 636.

References 

Populated places in Agsu District